Rob Milanese (born February 25, 1980) is a former American football wide receiver/cornerback who played for the Philadelphia Soul in the Arena Football League.

High school career
Milanese grew up in Wyckoff, New Jersey and attended Ramapo High School in Franklin Lakes where he was a standout in football and track. In football, he was a three-year letterman, and as a senior, he was the team captain, a first team All-County selection, and a third team All-State selection. In track, he helped lead his team to the League Championship and post an undefeated record as a senior.

College career
Milanese attended the University of Pennsylvania, and finished his career with 259 receptions for 3,405 yards (13.147 yards per rec. avg.) and 21 touchdown receptions. Both his 259 receptions and 3,405 receiving yards are school records and his 21 touchdowns are the eighth best in Ivy League history. In his senior year, he became the first Penn player and was only the 15th Ivy League player to receive for 1,000 or more yards in a season. He was an All-Ivy League Honorable Mention as a freshman, a second team All-Ivy League selection as a sophomore and junior, and was a first team All-Ivy League selection as a senior.

References

External links
AFL stats

1980 births
Living people
People from Wyckoff, New Jersey
American football wide receivers
Penn Quakers football players
Philadelphia Soul players
Players of American football from New Jersey
Ramapo High School (New Jersey) alumni
Sportspeople from Bergen County, New Jersey